Carlos Pineda Alvarado (21 February 1937 – 6 April 2000) was an Ecuadorian footballer. He played in four matches for the Ecuador national football team from 1963 to 1967. He was also part of Ecuador's squad for the 1963 South American Championship.

References

1937 births
2000 deaths
Ecuadorian footballers
Ecuador international footballers
Association football defenders
Sportspeople from Guayaquil